Gentlemen's clubs in India were many brought by the British, however there are some made after the independence of India mainly as a legacy of the empire. They were mostly built in urban cities, like Kolkata (previously spelt Calcutta) and Mumbai, where industrial workers went to rest after long hours of work.

Clubs
List of Gentlemen's club in India:

See also 
 Gymkhana
 List of American gentlemen's clubs
 List of London's gentlemen's clubs

Further reading

References

External links 
 Seth Alexander Thévoz, Global Clubs Directory

British India
Clubs and societies in India
Gentlemen's clubs
India
Men in India
British India-related lists